The Grand Canyon of Greenland is a tentative canyon of record length discovered underneath the Greenland ice sheet as reported in the journal Science on 30 August 2013 (submitted 29 April 2013), by scientists from the University of Bristol, University of Calgary, and University of Urbino, who described it as a mega-canyon.

Ice-penetrating radar data collected during NASA's Operation IceBridge showed a huge subglacial canyon running from the central region of the island northward into the Arctic Ocean, to the fjord of the Petermann Glacier. The bottom of the canyon is below sea level; the canyon is likely to have influenced basal water flow from the ice sheet interior to the margin. Jonathan Bamber, a geographer at University of Bristol, stated, "The distinctive V-shaped walls and flat bottom suggests water carved the buried valley, not ice."

There are, however, many canyons—including Arizona's Grand Canyon (1,857 meters) and Tibet's Yarlung Tsangpo Grand Canyon (overall 2,268 meters), previously the world's longest—that are deeper.

The canyon predates ice sheet inception and has influenced basal hydrology in Greenland over past glacial cycles.

References

2013 in Greenland
2013 in science
Canyons and gorges of North America
Grand canyon
Articles containing video clips